Chad Wagner (born November 12, 1974) is a Canadian former professional ice hockey enforcer.

While playing with the San Diego Gulls, Wagner was the most penalized player in the West Coast Hockey League for three consecutive years: during the 1996–97 season he received 503 penalty minutes in 45 games played; in 1997–98 he recorded 439 minutes over 34 games; and over the course of the 1998–99 campaign he was given 521 minutes in 43 games played to set the WCHL record for most penalty minutes in a single season.

On February 25, 2005, while playing with the Danbury Trashers, Wagner received a lifetime suspension from the United Hockey League when, instead of entering the penalty box, he broke free from a linesman to grab Adirondack Frostbite coach Marc Potvin.

References

External links

Chad Wagner vs Jason Spence (YouTube)

1974 births
Living people
Asheville Smoke players
Canadian ice hockey right wingers
Cincinnati Mighty Ducks players
Danbury Trashers players
Dayton Bombers players
Las Vegas Thunder players
Minnesota Blue Ox players
Orlando Jackals players
San Diego Gulls (WCHL) players
Ice hockey people from Calgary